Baek Ji-hoon (born 28 February 1985) is a South Korean former footballer who played as a midfielder.

Career

Debut in the K League
After leaving the high school, Baek joined the K League side Jeonnam Dragons. He made four appearances in his first season before he was moved into the reserve team. In 2004, Baek played seven games in the first team and his progress was noted by South Korea U20 coach Park Sung-hwa who installed him as a captain.

The following year Baek took another step forward when he joined FC Seoul. He appeared 15 times in the K League in the 2005 season, scoring one goal. In July 2006, FC Seoul negotiated with Suwon Samsung Bluewings to transfer Baek to Suwon. Later in the same month, his transfer was confirmed. The reported transfer fee was about $1.5 million.

Lee Man
Out of contract for six months, Baek decided to go abroad for the first time in his career. On 6 June 2018, he reached an agreement with Hong Kong Premier League side Lee Man. He scored his debut goal for the club on 27 October 2018 against Eastern in the Hong Kong Senior Challenge Shield in a 2–1 defeat.

Club career statistics

Honours

Club
Lee Man
 Hong Kong Sapling Cup: 2018–19

Entertainment

Filmography

Television shows

Notes

References

External links
 
 
 National Team Player Record 
 
 
 

1985 births
Living people
People from Sacheon
South Korean footballers
South Korean expatriate footballers
Association football midfielders
South Korea under-20 international footballers
South Korea under-23 international footballers
South Korea international footballers
Jeonnam Dragons players
FC Seoul players
Suwon Samsung Bluewings players
Gimcheon Sangmu FC players
Ulsan Hyundai FC players
Seoul E-Land FC players
Lee Man FC players
K League 1 players
K League 2 players
Hong Kong Premier League players
2006 FIFA World Cup players
Footballers at the 2008 Summer Olympics
Olympic footballers of South Korea
Footballers at the 2006 Asian Games
South Korean expatriate sportspeople in Hong Kong
Expatriate footballers in Hong Kong
Asian Games competitors for South Korea
Sportspeople from South Gyeongsang Province